Darya Rubenovna Samarchants (born 12 March 1995) is a Ukrainian badminton player. She was the women's doubles champion at the 2013 Slovak Open partnered with Anastasiya Dmytryshyn.

Achievements

BWF International Challenge/Series 
Women's doubles

  BWF International Challenge tournament
  BWF International Series tournament
  BWF Future Series tournament

References

External links 
 

Living people
1995 births
Sportspeople from Kharkiv
Ukrainian female badminton players
21st-century Ukrainian women